The Kungarakany language, also spelt Kungarakan, Gunerakan, Gungaragan, Gungarakanj, and Kangarraga, is undergoing a revival through an AIATSIS language grant and through the efforts of many dedicated people who have contributed their time, expertise and knowledge to revive this once thought extinct language.

The revitalisation of the Kungarakany language has been possible through a partnership between the Batchelor Institute Indigenous Tertiary Education and the Kungarakan Culture and  Education Association.  This phoenix language has risen from the ashes by the efforts and contributions of many, including the historical voice recordings of George Abluk, Madeleine England and Valentine Bynoe McGinness/McGuinness, and the comprehensive lexicon Ngun Koongurrkun by Senior Elder Ida Koormundum Bishop.  

Koormundum  persevered over 30 years to restore and revive the language, motivated by a promise to her mother Margaret Edwards (McGuinness) to record the language of Kungarakany country. This would not have been possible without the support of her relatives, tribal Elders such as, Uncles John (Jack McGinness), Valentine McGinness and Joseph Daniel McGinness, George Abluk, Magdeline England, Roger Yates, Jimmy Tupnook and Edith Cowan University’s Toby Metcalfe and her mentor, her mother.

References

Indigenous Australian languages in the Northern Territory
Extinct languages of the Northern Territory
Macro-Gunwinyguan languages
Language isolates of Australia